Bayt Zud is a village in Kharif District of 'Amran Governorate, Yemen.

Name and history 
According to the 10th-century writer al-Hamdani, Bayt Zud is named after Zuwad b. Sayf b. ʽAmr b. al-Sabīʽ, of the tribe of Hashid. He clarifies that Zūd, or Zuwad, was the Himyaritic form of the Arabic name Zayd. He also wrote that Bayt Zud had once been the site of a pre-Islamic palace. Bayt Zud is also mentioned several times in historical sources, including the Ghayat al-amani of Yahya ibn al-Husayn and the Sirat al-Hadi ila'l-Haqq'' of Ali ibn Muhammad al-Abbasi.

Notes

References 

Populated places in 'Amran Governorate